Gladden Windmill is an historic windmill formerly located on Pigeon Valley Road in Napoli, Cattaraugus County, New York. The windmill was built in 1890 and is a well-preserved example of a vertical wind turbine built during the 19th century. Although no longer operational, the turbine (and associated mill structure) is a rare example of wind power technology in the United States.

Turbine driven gristmill

The 4 story structure, a unique design built of wood on a stone foundation housed the mill machinery in the 3 floors that were under the 24 foot square turbine room, which had shutters to direct wind. An extension porch and the wind wheel is covered by gable roofs. The exterior walls were asphalt shingles and board siding. The vanes of the turbine were removed and used as siding in a nearby barn, the wheel itself was 18 feet across by thirteen feet high, each vane was three feet 8 inches high and of 1 1/4 white pine. Beneath the windmill the roof is covered in heavy tin that is soldered at the joints and corners, the entirety rests on eighty-eight foot long hemlock beams. The mill employed a grain elevator and the gears were iron. Gladden, a farmer, was interested after seeing a similar mill in Lincoln, Nebraska, which was officially recorded in the U.S. Patent Office on 3/19/1888 as patent No. 387424 awarded to Bernard Koeppe. George Gladden's was a larger version, with 16 vanes instead of 8. He incorporated an apple grater and a cider press, a lathe and the grist mill was a "Standard Mill" manufactured by Harrisons of New Haven, Connecticut. In good wind, (20-25 mph), He realized 20 horsepower from the mill.

Operation
The mill and attached farm tool repair shop operated for 40 years until a thrust bearing failed, as a result the operations were suspended. In 1973 the NPS sponsored The Gladden Turbine Emergency Recording Project which deconstructed the mill engineering.

It was listed on the National Register of Historic Places in 1973.  Since its listing, the windmill has been dismantled and moved to Conewango, New York.

References

External links

Windmills in New York (state)
Industrial buildings and structures on the National Register of Historic Places in New York (state)
Agricultural buildings and structures on the National Register of Historic Places in New York (state)
Historic American Engineering Record in New York (state)
Industrial buildings completed in 1890
Buildings and structures in Cattaraugus County, New York
National Register of Historic Places in Cattaraugus County, New York
Windmills on the National Register of Historic Places